The following outline is provided as an overview of and topical guide to the creation–evolution controversy.

Essence
 Creationism, and more specifically:
 Creation science, Intelligent design, Neo-Creationism, Old Earth and Young Earth creationism
 Evolution, and more specifically:
 Natural selection, Common descent, Origins of life, Age of the Earth/Universe
 Intelligent design
 Objections to evolution

History

 History of creationism
 History of evolutionary thought
 Reaction to Darwin's theory

Arguments
 Entropy and life
 Evidence of common descent
 Evolutionary argument against naturalism
 Fine-tuned universe
 Irreducible complexity
 Specified complexity
 Transitional fossil (commonly known as a missing link)

Acceptance
 Evolution as theory and fact
 Level of support for evolution
 Teach the Controversy
 Wedge strategy

Supporters of evolution:
 A Scientific Support for Darwinism
 List of scientific societies rejecting intelligent design
 Project Steve
 Clergy Letter Project

Supporters of creation or intelligent design
 A Scientific Dissent From Darwinism
 Answers in Genesis
 Discovery Institute
 Physicians and Surgeons who Dissent from Darwinism

Politics
 Intelligent design in politics
 Politics of creationism

Specific religious views
 Ahmadiyya views on evolution
 Evolution and the Roman Catholic Church
 Hindu views on evolution
 Jainism and non-creationism
 Jewish views on evolution
 Mormon views on evolution

Public education

Creation and evolution in public education
 Creation and evolution in public education in the United States
 Butler Act
 Scopes trial, 1925
 Epperson v. Arkansas, 1968
 Daniel v. Waters, 1975
 Segraves v. State of California, 1981
 McLean v. Arkansas, 1982
 Edwards v. Aguillard, 1987
 Webster v. New Lenox School District, 1990
 Freiler v. Tangipahoa Parish Board of Education, 1994
 Kansas evolution hearings, 2005
 Kitzmiller v. Dover Area School District, 2005
 Selman v. Cobb County School District, 2005

See also

References

External links 

 Talk.origins Index to Creationist Claims

Creation-evolution controversy
Creation-evolution controversy
Creation-evolution controversy
Creation-evolution controversy
Creation-evolution controversy
Creation-evolution controversy, topics